Bluffview is a census-designated place in the town of Sumpter, Sauk County, Wisconsin, United States, with a North Freedom address.

Description

The community was started as housing for workers of the now defunct Badger Army Ammunition Plant. As of the 2010 census, its population was 742. Dr. Evermor's Forevertron can be found in Bluffview.

See also
 List of census-designated places in Wisconsin

References

External links

Census-designated places in Wisconsin
Census-designated places in Sauk County, Wisconsin